Sherman, Washington, was a community in Lincoln County, located north of Wilbur, Washington, USA. Sherman, like many small towns in eastern Washington, sprang up in the agricultural boom of the 1880s and 1890s, spawned by the federal government's many homesteading acts. As the price of wheat fell, the average farm size increased, and better vehicles and roads made traveling easier, Sherman was abandoned. A church and a cemetery are all that remain, as the school has since fallen down. The Sherman community comes together every year on Memorial Day for a celebration at the church.  Farm families in the area and those pioneer families whose roots included the Sherman community in earlier years gather to honor those that have served and remember their families history as part of Sherman.

References

Ghost towns in Washington (state)
Geography of Lincoln County, Washington